Daucus insularis is a species of flowering plants of the family Apiaceae. The species is endemic to Cape Verde. The species was first described by Filippo Parlatore in 1849 as Tetrapleura insularis.

Distribution and ecology
Daucus insularis occurs on the islands of Santo Antão, São Vicente, São Nicolau, Santiago and Brava.

References

insularis
Endemic flora of Cape Verde
Plants described in 1850